Andrea Renzi (born 18 August 1989) is an Italian professional basketball player.

Pro career
From 2006 to 2010 he played for the Italian League club Pallacanestro Treviso. He then played with Scaligera Verona and Angelico Biella. In July 2013, he signed with Pallacanestro Trapani.

Italian national team
Renzi has also been a member of the senior men's Italian national basketball team at the EuroBasket 2011.

References

External links
Profile 

1989 births
Living people
Italian men's basketball players
Pallacanestro Biella players
Pallacanestro Trapani players
Pallacanestro Treviso players
Scaligera Basket Verona players
Sportspeople from Genoa
Centers (basketball)
Power forwards (basketball)